Air Equator was an airline based in Gan, Maldives. It operated services linking the southernmost island of Gan to other main islands in the Maldives. Its main base was Gan International Airport. The airline ceased operations in August 2005.

History 

The airline was established in 2003 and received its air operator's certificate on 10 October 2004 from the Maldives Civil Aviation Department. It started operations on 15 October 2004 with flights from Gan to the capital Malé. It is owned by A Faiz/A Murthy (60%) and Ziaf Enterprises Maldives (40%).  Subsequently, majority shares were purchased by SPA Aviation of Sri Lanka. The Airline operations were affected during the Asian tsunami in December 2004 and flew some relief material to affected islands. The Airline was chartered by the media and press accompanying the Turkish Prime Minister when he visited the Maldives for surveying the damage done by the tsunami. The airline discontinued all flights in May 2005 and finally ceased operations in August 2005 after disagreement between SPA Aviation and A. Faiz on financial and administrative control. Capt. Anup Murthy was the GM/CEO of the company and the Maldives CAD approved Accountable Manager for the company from inception. SPA Aviation had plans for reviving the Airline but could not do so as their source of funding did not materialize, till press time early 2006.

Destinations 

Air Equator operated services to the following domestic scheduled destinations (at January 2005): 
Gan (ceased operations)
Hanimaadhoo (ceased operations)
Kaadedhdhoo (ceased operations)
Malé. (ceased operations)

Fleet 
The Air Equator fleet consisted of 1 Fairchild F-27 aircraft (at January 2005). The aircraft still rests in the airline's livery on a grassy area near Gan International Airport

References

External links

Defunct airlines of the Maldives
Airlines established in 2003
Airlines disestablished in 2005